This is a list of major cases decided by the Judicial Committee of the Privy Council. These include appeals from the following countries:

Canada (criminal until 1933; Civil case until 1949)
Malaysia (until 1985)
Australia (until 1986)
Singapore (until 1994)
Hong Kong (until 1997)
New Zealand (until 2003)
Most Caribbean countries

1833–1899

1900–2000

2001 onwards

See also

List of High Court of Australia cases
List of House of Lords cases
List of Canadian appeals to the Judicial Committee of the Privy Council
List of Supreme Court of Canada cases

References

External links
Official website of the Judicial Committee of the Privy Council
Past judgments:
1999 • 2000 • 2001 • 2002 • 2003 • 2004 • 2005 • 2006 • 2007 • 2008 • 2009
Judgments prior to 1999

United Kingdom law-related lists